Eriophyes cerasicrumena, the  black cherry leaf gall mite, is a species of gall mite in the family Eriophyidae. This species was formerly a member of the genus Phytoptus. They produce galls on black cherry plants. Caterpillars of cherry gall azure feed on these galls, and apparently also on the mites themselves.

References

Eriophyidae
Animals described in 1867